2059 Baboquivari, provisional designation , is an asteroid classified as near-Earth object of the Amor group, approximately 1.9 kilometers in diameter. Discovered by the Indiana Asteroid Program in 1963, it was later named after the Baboquivari Mountains in Arizona, United States.

Discovery and recovery 

Baboquivari is one of the lowest numbered near-Earth asteroids as it was already discovered on 16 October 1963. The discovery observation was made by the Indiana Asteroid Program at Goethe Link Observatory near Brooklyn, Indiana, in the United States. Three months later, it became a lost asteroid until June 1976, when it was recovered by the Steward Observatory's 90-inch Bok Telescope at Kitt Peak National Observatory located in the Sonoran Desert of Arizona.

Classification and orbit 

Baboquivari is an Amor asteroid – a subgroup of near-Earth asteroids that approach the orbit of Earth from beyond, but do not cross it. It orbits the Sun at a distance of 1.2–4.1 AU once every 4 years and 4 months (1,577 days). Its orbit has an eccentricity of 0.53 and an inclination of 11° with respect to the ecliptic.
The body's observation arc begins at the discovering observatory, 10 days after its official discovery observation.

Close approaches 

It approached the Earth at a similar distance on 20 October 1963, shortly after its discovery. The eccentric asteroid is also a Mars-crosser and approached Jupiter at a distance of about 1.4 AU on 20 April 1970.

Physical characteristics 

Little is known about Baboquivaris physical characteristics. Its spectral type has never been determined.

Diameter and albedo 

It is classified as a near-Earth object larger than one kilometer in diameter by the Minor Planet Center ("1+ KM"). A generic magnitude-to-diameter conversion gives a diameter of 1.9 kilometers, based on the body's absolute magnitude of 16.0 and an assumed standard albedo for stony S-type asteroids (Baboquivari would still measure 1.3 kilometers in diameter, if it had a higher albedo of 0.4, typically seen among bright members of the Hungaria family).

Rotation period 

As of 2017, no rotational lightcurve of Baboquivari has been obtained from photometric observations. The asteroid's rotation period, poles and shape remain unknown.

Naming 

This minor planet was named after the main-peak of the Baboquivari Mountains, a sacred location in the mythology of the Papago Indian Tribe. The Observatories of the Association of Universities for Research in Astronomy (AURA) are located on the Baboquivari land, just a few kilometers south of Kitt Peak. The approved naming citation was published by the Minor Planet Center on 1 December 1979.

References

External links 
 Asteroid Lightcurve Database (LCDB), query form (info )
 Dictionary of Minor Planet Names, Google books
 Asteroids and comets rotation curves, CdR – Observatoire de Genève, Raoul Behrend
 
 
 

002059
002059
Named minor planets
19631016